Morrow is an unincorporated community and census-designated place (CDP) in St. Landry Parish, Louisiana, United States, located just east of U.S. Route 71. It was first listed as a CDP in the 2020 census with a population of 149.

A post office has existed in this community since 1883.

Public school students in Morrow attended Morrow Elementary School (under the supervision of the St. Landry Parish School Board) until the school was closed due to dwindling school population and a federal desegregation order in 2009.

Morrow is served by St. Landry Parish Fire Protection District #7.

Demographics

2020 census

Note: the US Census treats Hispanic/Latino as an ethnic category. This table excludes Latinos from the racial categories and assigns them to a separate category. Hispanics/Latinos can be of any race.

References

Unincorporated communities in St. Landry Parish, Louisiana
Census-designated places in St. Landry Parish, Louisiana